Susan Strange (9 June 1923 – 25 October 1998) was a British scholar who was "almost single-handedly responsible for creating international political economy." Notable publications include Sterling and British Policy (1971), Casino Capitalism (1986), States and Markets (1988), The Retreat of the State (1996), and Mad Money (1998).

She helped create the British International Studies Association. She was the first woman to hold the Montague Burton Professor of International Relations at the London School of Economics and was the first female academic to have a professorship named after her at the LSE.

Early life
Susan Strange was born on 9 June 1923 in Langton Matravers (County Dorset). She was the daughter of English aviator Louis Strange. She went to the Royal High School, Bath, and to the University of Caen in France, and graduated with a bachelor's degree in economics from the London School of Economics (LSE) during the Second World War. Like Robert W. Cox, the other founder of British International Political Economy, she never obtained a PhD.

Career
Susan Strange earned a first in economics at the London School of Economics (LSE) in 1943. She raised six children and worked as a financial journalist for The Economist, then The Observer until 1957. At The Observer, she became the youngest White House correspondent of her time. She began lecturing on International Politics at the University College London in 1949.

In 1964, she became a full-time researcher at Chatham House (formally The Royal Institute of International Affairs). At the Chatham House, she authored Sterling and British Policy (1971). She set up an influential research group on IPE at the Chatham House in 1971. She played a role in the establishing of the journal Review of International Political Economy, which is the leading journal dedicated to IPE.

From 1978 to 1988, she served as the Montague Burton Professor of International Relations at LSE, and was the first woman at LSE to hold this chair and professorship. At the LSE, she built Britain's first graduate program in IPE.

She served as professor of international political economy at the European University Institute in Florence, Italy, from 1989 to 1993. Strange's final academic post, which she held from 1993 until her death in 1998, was as chair of international relations and professor of international political economy at the University of Warwick, where she built up the graduate programme in International Political Economy. She also taught in Japan, where between 1993 and 1996 she was several times guest lecturer at Aoyama Gakuin University in Tokyo.

She was a major figure in the professional associations in both Britain and the United States. She was an instrumental founding member and the first treasurer of the British International Studies Association, and served as the third female president of the International Studies Association in 1995.

International relations scholarship
Strange was an influential thinker on global affairs. She played a central role in developing international political economy (IPE) as a field of study, and is a key figure in political economy approaches to security studies. Her 1970 article, "International Economics and International Relations: A Case of Mutual Neglect", laid out her arguments for the need of a discipline of IPE.

She argued that power was central to international political economy. She claimed that in general, "economists simply do not understand how the global economy works" due to a poor understanding of power and an over-reliance on abstract economic models. However, she noted that political scientists also have a woeful understanding of international economics due to their emphasis on institutions and power. Thus she became one of the earliest campaigners advocating the necessity of studying both politics and economics for international relations scholars. She influenced scholars such as Robert Gilpin. She was a critic of regime theory, arguing that the scholarship on regimes was too state-centric and carried a hidden bias in favor of maintaining U.S. hegemony.

In the 1980s, she disagreed with claims by other International Studies scholars that U.S. hegemony was on the decline. Strange was skeptical of static indicators of power, arguing that it was structural power that mattered. In particular, interactions between states and markets mattered. She pointed to the superiority of the American technology sector, dominance in services, and the position of the U.S. dollar as the top international currency as real indicators of lasting power.

Power and international financial markets
Strange's key contribution to IPE was on the issue of power, which she considered essential to the character and dynamics of the global economy. She distinguished between relational power (the power to compel A to get B to do something B does not want to do) and structural power (the power to shape and determine the structure of the global political economy).

States and Markets (1988) delineates four key forms of power—security, production, finance, and knowledge; power is the ability to "provide protection, make things, obtain access to credit, and develop and control authoritative modes of interpreting the world". Strange posits that the most overlooked channel of power is financial access, which consequently becomes the most important one to comprehend; in other words, she argues that one cannot comprehend how the world works without a thorough understanding of international financial markets. To illustrate, Casino Capitalism, published in 1986, discusses the dangers of the international financial system, which she considered confirmed by the 1997 Asian financial crisis. There is a financial "contagion" creating a huge instability in the international financial markets.

Her analysis in States and Markets (1988) focused on what she called the "market-authority nexus", the see-saw of power between the market and political authority. She maintained that the global market, relative to the nation state, had gained significant power since the 1970s and that a "dangerous gap" was emerging between the two. She considered nation states inflexible, limited by territorial boundaries in a world of fragile intergovernmental co-operation; "Westfailure" is what she called Westphalia. Markets would be able to flout regulations and reign free, creating more uncertainty and risk in an already chaotic environment.

Position on the International Monetary System
In Casino Capitalism (Blackwells, 1986), Susan Strange problemizes the nonsystem that the international monetary system has become. She compares it with a casino whereon the foreign exchange plays as snakes and ladders. She sets the stakes that international finance has become stronger than states and has been deregularized. The Smithsonian Agreement has been weak leading further to benign neglect from the US, the Eurodollar market and OPEC has been strong undermining the Bretton Woods system. There is no state or actor governing the international monetary system and the international financial markets. American banks are made free to pursue their interests since the 1980s strengthened by the possibility to finance American bonds in the world, making a carousel of bond trading with the OPEC and the Eurodollar market. The forces of market integration set by the Bretton Woods system was going through.

Mad Money (University of Manchester Press, 1998) updated the analysis of Casino Capitalism to the late 1990s. At the time of her death, she was working on an exposition of her theory of the international money system.

Honours and awards 
Susan Strange is remembered through the following annual awards:

 Susan Strange Award established in 1998 by the US-based International Studies Association which "recognizes a person whose singular intellect, assertiveness, and insight most challenge conventional wisdom and intellectual and organizational complacency in the international studies community."
 Susan Strange Book Prize established in 2010 by the British International Studies Association "for an outstanding book published in any field of International Studies" each year.
 Susan Strange Young Scholar Award given by the Center for Global Studies at the University of Bonn for "female students who have submitted an excellent thesis with a research focus on international relations".

Personal life
In 1942, she married Denis Merritt (died 1993); they had one son and one daughter, and the marriage was dissolved in 1955. In 1955 she married Clifford Selly, with whom she had three sons, and one daughter.

Bibliography
 
International Economic Relations of the Western World, 1959-1971: International Monetary Relations (1976)
Casino Capitalism (1986) 
States and Markets (1988) 
 
Rival States, Rival Firms: Competition for World Market Shares with John M. Stopford and John S. Henley (1991) 
The Retreat of the State: The Diffusion of Power in the World Economy (1996) 
Mad Money: When Markets Outgrow Governments (1998)

References

Sources 
 
 Harry Bauer & Elisabetta Brighi (Eds) (2003) International Relations at LSE: A History of 75 Years, London: Millennium Publishing Group, .

External links
 
 
 
Critical Biography
Obituary

1923 births
1998 deaths
British political scientists
Academics of the London School of Economics
Academic staff of the European University Institute
British international relations scholars
Political realists
People from Dorset
Academics of the University of Warwick
Chatham House people
Women political scientists
British expatriates in France
20th-century political scientists